Michal Wiezik (born 14 June 1979 in Martin) is a Slovak politician who was elected as a Member of the European Parliament in 2019.

Political career
In addition to his committee assignments, Wiezik is part of the European Parliament Intergroup on Climate Change, Biodiversity and Sustainable Development and the European Parliament Intergroup on Seas, Rivers, Islands and Coastal Areas.

In late 2021, Wiezik left the European People's Party to join the Renew Europe group.

References

Living people
MEPs for Slovakia 2019–2024
1979 births
People from Martin, Slovakia